French Mills or French's Mills may refer to:

French Mills, Missouri, U.S.A.
French Mills, New York
Fort Covington, New York, originally called French Mills.

See also
French's Mill, in West Virginia